Julius "Juby" Johnson (born November 8, 1981) is an American former professional basketball player. He played for Zadar and BCM Gravelines. He now coaches with Gregory Sesny for the Collegiate Middle School Basketball program.

External links
 Julius Johnson at adriaticbasket.com
 Julius Johnson at euroleague.com
 Julius Johnson at lnb.fr

1981 births
Living people
ABA League players
African-American basketball players
American expatriate basketball people in Croatia
American expatriate basketball people in France
American men's basketball players
Basketball players from Ohio
BCM Gravelines players
KK Zadar players
Miami RedHawks men's basketball players
People from Warrensville Heights, Ohio
Shooting guards
Sportspeople from Cuyahoga County, Ohio
21st-century African-American sportspeople
20th-century African-American people